Joseph John Gill (September 21, 1846 – May 22, 1920) was an American lawyer and politician who served two terms as a U.S. Representative from Ohio from 1899 to 1903.

Biography 
Born in Barnesville, Ohio, Gill moved with his parents to Mount Pleasant, Ohio,  in 1848.
He pursued an academic course and was graduated from the law department of the University of Michigan at Ann Arbor in 1868.
He was admitted to the bar and commenced practice in Jefferson County, Ohio.
He subsequently engaged in banking and later in manufacturing and iron mining.

Congress 
Gill was elected as a Republican to the Fifty-sixth Congress to fill the vacancy caused by the death of Lorenzo Danford.
He was reelected to the Fifty-seventh and Fifty-eighth Congresses and served from December 4, 1899, until October 31, 1903, when he resigned.

Death 
He died in Steubenville, Ohio, May 22, 1920.
He was interred in Union Cemetery.

Sources

1846 births
1920 deaths
People from Mount Pleasant, Ohio
University of Michigan Law School alumni
Ohio lawyers
Burials at Union Cemetery-Beatty Park
People from Barnesville, Ohio
19th-century American lawyers
Republican Party members of the United States House of Representatives from Ohio